Susan J. Armistead Moore House, also known as Poplar Neck and Jubilee Farm, is a historic home located near Edenton, Chowan County, North Carolina. It was built about 1853, and is a -story, three bay, double-pile Greek Revival-style frame dwelling.  It features engaged, tiered porches across both the front and rear elevations.

It was listed on the National Register of Historic Places in 2005.

References

Houses on the National Register of Historic Places in North Carolina
Greek Revival houses in North Carolina
Houses completed in 1853
Houses in Chowan County, North Carolina
National Register of Historic Places in Chowan County, North Carolina